Face to Face vs. Dropkick Murphys is a split EP released by Face to Face and Dropkick Murphys in February 2002 on Vagrant Records.

Of the Dropkick Murphys tracks, "The Dirty Glass" was re-recorded for the band's next album Blackout and the other two songs were featured on the compilation album Singles Collection, Volume 2.

Track list

2002 EPs
Dropkick Murphys albums
Vagrant Records EPs
Split EPs